Clinosperma is a palm tree genus in the family Arecaceae.

The genus has 4 known species, all endemic to the Island of New Caledonia, in the Melanesia bioregion of the southwestern Pacific Ocean. Its closest relative is Cyphokentia, also endemic to New Caledonia, and sole other genus of subtribe Clinospermatinae.

Species 
 Clinosperma bractealis (Brongn.) Becc., Palme Nuova Caledonia: 52 (1920).
 Clinosperma lanuginosa (H.E.Moore) Pintaud & W.J.Baker, Kew Bull. 63: 69 (2008).
 Clinosperma macrocarpa (H.E.Moore) Pintaud & W.J.Baker, Kew Bull. 63: 70 (2008).
 Clinosperma vaginata (Brongn.) Pintaud & W.J.Baker, Kew Bull. 63: 70 (2008).

References

External links 
 

Clinospermatinae
Endemic flora of New Caledonia
Trees of New Caledonia
Arecaceae genera
Taxa named by Odoardo Beccari